Laurent Croci (born 8 December 1964) is a French football manager and former player, who last managed FC Mulhouse.

Playing career
Croci was born in Montbéliard, Doubs. He began his career with Sochaux, featuring for the clubs 'B' team until he turned 18. Croci spent 10 years in the first team, before leaving for Bordeaux. Whilst at Bordeaux he won the 1995 UEFA Intertoto Cup and played in the 1996 UEFA Cup Final, and was cautioned in the first leg.

After five years with Bordeaux, Croci spent time with Scottish side Dundee, before joining Carlisle United. However, he only played one game for each club, before he left for Swiss side Étoile Carouge.

He returned to France to finish his career with amateur sides Lormont and Blanquefort, before managing the latter for the 2000–01 season.

External links

External links
 
 Profile on Croix de Savoie official site

1964 births
Living people
Sportspeople from Montbéliard
French footballers
FC Sochaux-Montbéliard players
FC Girondins de Bordeaux players
Carlisle United F.C. players
Scottish Football League players
Dundee F.C. players
Ligue 1 players
French football managers
US Créteil-Lusitanos managers
French people of Italian descent
Stade Poitevin FC managers
Entente SSG managers
FC Mulhouse managers
Association football defenders
Footballers from Bourgogne-Franche-Comté
French expatriate sportspeople in England
French expatriate sportspeople in Scotland
Expatriate footballers in England
Expatriate footballers in Scotland
French expatriate footballers
Expatriate footballers in Switzerland
French expatriate sportspeople in Switzerland